Elstelä is a Finnish surname. Notable people with the surname include:

Esko Elstelä (1931–2007), Finnish screenwriter and film director
Kristiina Elstelä (1943–2016), Finnish actress

Finnish-language surnames